Bücken is a municipality in the district of Nienburg, in Lower Saxony, Germany.

Quarters
 Altenbücken
 Bücken
 Calle
 Dedendorf
 Duddenhausen

History
An Abbey was established here in Bücken in the year 882 by Rimbert, Archbishop of Bremen. On Bücken’s market place stands a monument which serves as a reminder of the unusual legend surrounding its origin: a donkey is said to have indicated the site where the church was to be built.

About 1050, the original wooden structure was replaced by a relatively small stone edifice which was expanded in several stages of construction until the year 1350. With the dissolution of the Abbey and its property after the reformation, the church fell partly to ruin and remained so until its full restoration through Adelbert Hotzen in the years 1863–1867. Since 1413 Bücken is a market town.

Notable people
Georg Dietrich Leyding, 1664–1710, German composer and organist
Carl Koldewey, 1837–1908, German Arctic explorer
William Wrede, 1859-1906, German Lutheran theologian

References

External links

Nienburg (district)